The 2019–20 UC Irvine Anteaters men's basketball team represented the University of California, Irvine in the 2019–20 NCAA Division I men's basketball season. The Anteaters were led by tenth-year head coach Russell Turner competing in the Bren Events Center. UC Irvine is a member of the Big West Conference. The team won their second straight Big West Regular Season title before the 2020 Big West Conference men's basketball tournament and subsequently, the remainder of the 2019–20 NCAA Division I men's basketball season and postseason tournaments were canceled as a result of the COVID-19 Pandemic. The team finished 21–11, and has won at least a share of 3 of the last 4 Big West Regular season titles. The program has won at least 20 games in 7 of the last 8 seasons. Turner became the winningest coach in program history on Jan 15 surpassing Pat Douglass total of 197 wins and won his 4th Big West Coach of the Year Award. Evan Leonard, Eyassu Worku, and Tommy Rutherford all recorded their 1000th point during the season, the first time the program has had 3 players score 1,000 career points in the same season. The team was 12th in the nation in FG % defense holding opponents to (38.8%) shooting, 11th in total rebounds (1,269), 3rd in rebounding margin (+9.4). Brad Greene pulled down a Bren Events Center record 21 rebounds on Jan. 11 vs. Hawai'i.

Previous season

The Anteaters finished the season a program best 31–6 overall, and 15–1 in the conference and recorded their first ever NCAA Tournament win over Kansas State in the South Region 1st Round before falling to Oregon in the second round. During the season, the Anteaters participated in the 2019 Gulf Coast Showcase, which was held in Estero, Florida, where they were runner-ups defeating UTSA and Tulane before losing to Toledo. Prior to the season, the Anteaters competed in the 2018 Asia-Pacific University Basketball Challenge, hosted by the KBA and Yonsei University where they were also runner-ups.

Offseason

Departures

Roster

Schedule

|-
!colspan=12 style=""| Exhibition

|-
!colspan=12 style=""| Non-conference regular season

|-
!colspan=12 style=""| Big West regular season

|-
!colspan=12 style=""| Big West tournament

|-

References

UC Irvine Anteaters men's basketball seasons
UC Irvine
UC Irvine
UC Irvine